Aaron M. Prupas is a retired United States Air Force major general who served as the director for intelligence and information of the United States Northern Command. Prior to that, he held the same position for the Air Combat Command. In April 2021, he was assigned to become the  director of defense intelligence for warfighter support at the Office of the Under Secretary of Defense for Intelligence.

Prupas retired from active duty in 2022.

References

External links
 

Living people
Major generals
Place of birth missing (living people)
Recipients of the Defense Superior Service Medal
Recipients of the Legion of Merit
United States Air Force generals
United States Air Force personnel of the Gulf War
United States Air Force personnel of the War in Afghanistan (2001–2021)
Year of birth missing (living people)